Mohami is a City of Sankhar in Chapakot of Syangja District of Gandaki Province in Nepal. At the time of the 2011 Nepal census, it had a population of 339 people residing in 75 individual households.

Climate

References

External links 
Chapakot Municipality
District Coordination Committee Office, Syangja, Nepal

See also

Syangja District
Populated places in Syangja District